Zuidzijde (Dutch for "south side") is the name of several Dutch villages:

 Zuidzijde, Bodegraven-Reeuwijk
 Zuidzijde, Goeree-Overflakkee
 Zuidzijde, Hoeksche Waard